Claudinei is a given name. It may refer to:

 Maurílio (footballer) (born 1969), Cléverson Maurílio Silva, Brazilian football manager and former striker
 Cleverson da Silva (born 1973), Brazilian hurdler
 Cleverson (footballer) (born 1983), Cleverson Rosário dos Santos, Brazilian football midfielder
 Cléo (born 1985), Cléverson Gabriel Córdova, Brazilian football striker

See also
 Cleberson, given name